The Pioneer Press publishes 32 local newspapers in the Chicago area. It is a division of Tribune Publishing, and is based in Chicago.

The community newspapers are the main source of local news in Illinois communities such as Winnetka, Highland Park, and Lake Forest.

Pioneer Press community newspapers
The following is a listing of all Pioneer Press Chicago newspapers, as of 2014:

 Barrington Courier-Review
 Buffalo Grove Countryside
 Deerfield Review 
 The Doings Clarendon Hills
 The Doings Hinsdale
 The Doings La Grange
 The Doings Oak Brook
 The Doings Weekly
 The Doings Western Springs
 Elm Leaves
 Evanston Review

 Forest Leaves
 Franklin Park Herald Journal
 Glencoe News
 Glenview Announcements
 Highland Park News
 Lake Forester
 Lake Zurich Courier
 Libertyville Review
 Lincolnshire Review
 Lincolnwood Review
 Morton Grove Champion

 Mundelein Review
 Niles Herald-Spectator
 Norridge Harwood Heights News
 Northbrook Star
 Oak Leaves
 Park Ridge Herald Advocate
 Skokie Review
 Vernon Hills Review
 Wilmette Life
 Winnetka Talk

History
In 2005, Hollinger merged the 80-year-old Lerner Newspapers chain into Pioneer Press, Pioneer's first real inroads into the city of Chicago. Despite announcements by Publisher Larry Green that Pioneer intended to "grow" the Lerner Papers, over the course of the next six months, Pioneer dumped the venerable Lerner name, shut down most of its editions and laid off most of its employees. Subsequently, the Sun-Times ceased production of Skyline, the Booster and News-Star, the remaining members of the Lerner group, eliminated the jobs, and sold the titles to Oak Park-based Wednesday Journal. In 2014, the Pioneer Press newspapers were sold to the Chicago Tribune Media Group.

References

External links 
 

Newspaper companies in Chicago
Tribune Publishing
Cook County, Illinois
DuPage County, Illinois
Lake County, Illinois